Common Thread may refer to:

 Common Thread (The Oak Ridge Boys album), released in 2005
 Common Thread (Spermbirds album), released in 1990
 Common Thread: The Songs of the Eagles, released in 1993

See also
 A Common Thread, 2004 French film
 Common Threads (disambiguation)